Daniel Woodrow is a Canadian stand-up comedian from Toronto, Ontario. He is most noted as part of the ensemble that received a Canadian Screen Award nomination for Best Performance in a Variety or Sketch Comedy Program or Series at the 10th Canadian Screen Awards, for the debut episode of Roast Battle Canada.

He has been an organizer of the Underground Comedy Railroad, an all-Black Canadian comedy tour which takes place each year during Black History Month. In 2021, with the tour unable to take place due to the COVID-19 pandemic in Canada, he created the Unknown Comedy Club, an online streaming platform for comedy performances.

He has also had acting roles in the television series The Beaverton, Star Trek: Discovery and Pretty Hard Cases.

References

Living people
Canadian male comedians
Canadian male television actors
Canadian stand-up comedians
Black Canadian comedians
Black Canadian male actors
Comedians from Toronto
Male actors from Toronto
21st-century Canadian comedians
21st-century Canadian male actors
Year of birth missing (living people)